De Haen is a Dutch surname. Notable people with the surname include:

 Abraham de Haen (1707–1748), Dutch engraver
 Anton de Haen (1704–1776), Austrian physician
 David de Haen (1585–1622), Dutch painter and draughtsman
 

Dutch-language surnames